Garhshankar is a city in Hoshiarpur district in the state of Punjab, India.

History
It was founded by Doad Rajput king named Shankar Sahai in 1000 AD. Garhshankar was converted as a Tehsil in the year of 1844 by the British administration.

Politics 
Jai Krishan Singh Rouri, (AAP) is the second term MLA from Garhshankar Assembly Constituency, elected in 2022 Punjab Assembly Elections. He was first elected as MLA in 2017 Punjab Assembly Elections.

Demographics
Males constitute 52% of the population and females 48%. Garhshankar has an average literacy rate of 73%, higher than the national average of 59.5%: male literacy is 76%, and female literacy is 70%.

Railways
Garhshankar Railway Station, Satnaur Badesron Railway Station are the very nearby railway stations to Garhshankar.

Education
 Govt. Sen. Sec. School, Garhshankar
 S.B.S. Model High School.
 Doaba Public Sen. Sec. School Parowal, Garhshankar
 Mount Carmel School, Garhshanka
 St. Soldier Divine Public School, Garhshankar
 Garhshankar Education Society, Nangal Road, Garhshankar.
 Babbar Akali Memorial Khalsa College Garhshankar
 P.D. Bedi Sen.Sec. Arya School.
 M.D.K.S.D. Public School
 Vidya Sagar Public School
 Shri Guru Teg Bahadur Sen.Sec.School
 B Bits (Computer Courses, and Training Center) Chandigarh Chowk, Garhshankar.
 Navjot Senior Secondary School.

References

Cities and towns in Hoshiarpur district